Aḥmad al-Fārūqī al-Sirhindī (1564-1624), also known as Imam Rabbani, was an Indian Islamic scholar, Hanafi jurist, and member of the Naqshbandī Sufi order. He has been described by some followers as a Mujaddid, meaning a “reviver", for his work in rejuvenating Islam and opposing the newly made religion of Din-i Ilahi and other problematic opinions of Mughal emperor Akbar. While early South Asian scholarship credited him for contributing to conservative trends in Indian Islam, more recent works, notably by ter Haar, Friedman, and Buehler, have pointed to Sirhindi's significant contributions to Sufi epistemology and practices.

Most of the Naqshbandī suborders today, such as the Muḥammadī, Haqqānī, Qāsimī, trace their spiritual lineage through Sirhindi as the Mujaddidī branch.

Sirhindi's shrine, known as Rauza Sharif, is located in Sirhind, Punjab, India.

Early life and education 
Ahmad Sirhindi was born on 26 May 1564 in the village of Sirhind, Punjab. He received most of his early education from his father, 'Abd al-Ahad, his brother, Muhammad Sadiq and from Muhammad Tahir al-Lahuri.  He also memorised the Qur'an. He then studied in Sialkot, which had become an intellectual centre under the Kashmir-born scholar Kamaluddin Kashmiri.  There he learned logic, philosophy and theology and read advanced texts of tafsir and hadith under another scholar from Kashmir, Shaykh Yaqub Sarfi Kashmiri (1521-1595), who was a sheikh of the tariqa Hamadaniyya Mir Sayyid Ali Hamadani Sufi Order. Qazi Bahlol Badakhshani taught him jurisprudence, prophet Muhammad's biography and history.

Sirhindi also made rapid progress in the Suhrawardī, the Qadirī, and the Chistī traditions, and was given permission to initiate and train followers at the age of 17. He eventually joined the Naqshbandī order through the Sufi missionary Khwaja Baqi Billah, and became a leading master of this order. His deputies traversed the Mughal Empire in order to popularize the order and eventually won favour with the Mughal court.

Views 

Ahmad Sirhindi's teaching emphasized the inter-dependence of both the Sufi path and sharia, stating that "what is outside the path shown by the prophet is forbidden." Arthur Buehler explains that Sirhindi's concept of shariah is a multivalent and inclusive term encompassing outward acts of worship, faith, and the Sufi path. Sirhindi emphasizes Sufi initiation and practices as a necessary part of shariah, and criticizes jurists who follow only the outward aspects of the sharia. In his criticism of the superficial jurists, he states: "For a worm hidden under a rock, the sky is the bottom of the rock."

Views on Shias 
Sirhindi also wrote a treatise under the title "Radd-e-Rawafiz" to justify the execution of Shia nobles by Abdullah Khan Uzbek in Mashhad. In this he argues:
"Since the Shia permit cursing Abu Bakr, Umar, Uthman and one of the chaste wives (of the Prophet), which in itself constitutes infidelity, it is incumbent upon the Muslim ruler, nay upon all people, in compliance with the command of the Omniscient King (Allah), to kill them and to oppress them in order to elevate the true religion. It is permissible to destroy their buildings and to seize their property and belongings."
He has expressed his hate towards Shias in his letters too. According to him, the worst distorters of faith "are those who bear malice against the companions of Prophet Muhammad. God has called them Kafirs in the Quran". In a letter to his discple Sheikh Farid,  the Mir Bakhshi of the Mughal empire, he said that showing respect to the distorters of faith (ahl-e-Bidʻah) amounted to destruction of Islam.

Views on Sikhism 

He was hostile to the Sikhs. In his Makutbat letter 193 he is said to have stated [sic]:

Jahangir writes in his Tuzuk that he had the Guru put to death and had his property confiscated. Mujaddid-i-Alf Thani Sheikh Ahmed Sirhindi (1564-1624), as a hard-line supporter of Islamic orthodoxy and a highly influential religious revivalist, had opposed Akbar’s policy of religious tolerance. He had concerns about the spread of Sikhism in Punjab. So he cheered on the murder of the Guru, thus giving it a religious rather than political colour.

Importance of Sufism in Shari’ah 
According to Simon Digby, "modern hagiographical literature emphasizes Sirhindi's reiterated profession of strict Islamic orthodoxy, his exaltation of the shariah and exhortations towards its observance." On the other hand, Yohanan Friedmann questions how committed Sirhindi was to shariah by commenting: "it is noteworthy that while Shaykh Ahmad Sirhindi never wearies of describing the minutest details of Sufi experience, his exhortations to comply with the shariah remain general to an extreme." Friedmann also claims "Shaykh Ahmad Sirhindi was primarily a Sufi interested first and foremost in questions of mysticism." Sirhindi wrote a letter to Mughal emperor Jehangir emphasizing that he is now correcting the wrong path taken by his father, emperor Akbar.

Oneness of appearance and oneness of being 

Ahmad Sirhindi advanced the notion of wahdat ash-shuhūd (oneness of appearance). According to this doctrine, the experience of unity between God and creation is purely subjective and occurs only in the mind of the Sufi who has reached the state of fana' fi Allah (to forget about everything except Almighty Allah). Sirhindi considered wahdat ash-shuhūd to be superior to wahdat al-wujūd (oneness of being), which he understood to be a preliminary step on the way to the Absolute Truth.

Despite this, Sirhindi still used Ibn al-'Arabi's vocabulary without hesitation.

Sirhindi writes:

I wonder that Shaykh Muhyī 'l-Dīn appears in vision to be one of those with whom God is pleased, while most of his ideas which differ from the doctrines of the People of truth appear to be wrong and mistaken. It seems that since they are due to error in kashf, he has been forgiven... I consider him as one of those with whom God is well-pleased; on the other hand, I believe that all his ideas in which he opposes (the people of truth) are wrong and harmful.

On the other hand, William C. Chittick, a prominent Ibn 'Arabi scholar, writes:

When Sirhindī explains the meaning of waḥdat al-wujūd, he demonstrates little acquaintance with the writings of Ibn ʿArabī or his major followers. By insisting that it was an inadequate expression of the nature of things and that it needed to be supplanted by waḥdat al-shuhūd, he was taking for granted that it was the teaching of Ibn ʿArabī and that wujūd was being used in the philosophical sense. He seemed not to recognize that Ibn ʿArabī used it to mean “finding” and “witnessing” as well as “being” and “existence.” So, at least partly because Sirhindī was oblivious to the meaning of wujūd as finding and perceiving, he felt it necessary to insist that seeing God in all things goes back to the viewer. The unity achieved on the path to God, he claimed, is that of shuhūd, not that of wujūd. But, for Ibn ʿArabī and many of his followers these two words meant the same thing. So Sirhindī not only ascribes a doctrine to Ibn ʿArabī that he does not profess—waḥdat al-wujūd—but he also understands wujūd in a way that is not compatible with Ibn ʿArabī’s use of the word.

Reality of the Quran and Ka'ba versus the reality of Muhammad 

Sirhindi had originally declared the reality of the Quran (haqiqat-i quran) and the reality of the Ka'ba (haqiqat-i ka'ba-yi rabbani) to be above the reality of Muhammad (haqiqat-i Muhammadi). This caused fury of opposition, particularly among certain Sufis and ulama of Hijaz who objected to the Ka'ba having exalted spiritual "rank" than the Prophet. Sirhindi argued in response that the reality of the Prophet is superior to any creature. The real Ka'ba is worthy of prostration since it is not created and is covered with the veil of nonexistence. It is this Ka'ba in the essence of God that Sirhindi was referring to as the reality of the Ka'ba, not the appearance of the Ka'ba (surat-i ka'ba), which is only a stone. By the latter part of the nineteenth century, the consensus of the Naqshbandi community had placed the prophetic realities closer to God than the divine realities. The rationale for this development may have been to neutralize unnecessary discord with the large Muslim community whose emotional attachment to Muhammad was greater than any understanding of philosophical fine points.

Sufi lineage

Naqshbandi chain 
Naqshbandi Sufis claim that Ahmad Sirhindi is descended from a long line of "spiritual masters" all the way up to prophet Muhammad.
 Muhammad, d. 11 AH, buried in Medina, Saudi Arabia (570/571–632 CE)
 Abu Bakar Siddique, d. 13 AH, buried in Medina, Saudi Arabia
 Salman al-Farsi, d. 35 AH, buried in Madaa'in, Saudi Arabia
 Qasim ibn Muhammad ibn Abi Bakr, d. 107 AH, buried in Medina, Saudi Arabia.
 Jafar Sadiq, d. 148 AH, buried in Medina, Saudi Arabia.
 Bayazid Bastami, d. 261 AH, buried in Bastaam, Iran (804 - 874 CE).
 Abu al-Hassan al-Kharaqani, d. 425 AH, buried Kharqaan, Iran.
 Abul Qasim Gurgani, d. 450 AH, buried in Gurgan, Iran.
 Abu ali Farmadi, d. 477 AH, buried in Tous, Khorasan, Iran.
 Abu Yaqub Yusuf Hamadani, d. 535 AH, buried in Maru, Khorosan, Iran.
 Abdul Khaliq Ghujdawani, d. 575 AH, buried in Ghajdawan, Bukhara, Uzbekistan.
 Arif Riwgari, d. 616 AH, buried in Reogar, Bukhara, Uzbekistan.
 Mahmood Anjir-Faghnawi, d. 715 AH, buried in Waabakni, Mawarannahr, Uzbekistan.
 Azizan Ali Ramitani, d. 715 AH, buried in Khwarezm, Bukhara, Uzbekistan.
 Mohammad Baba As-Samasi, d. 755 AH, buried in Samaas, Bukhara, Uzbekistan.
 Amir Kulal, d. 772 AH, buried in Saukhaar, Bukhara, Uzbekistan.
 Baha-ud-Din Naqshband Bukhari, d. 791 AH, buried in Qasr-e-Aarifan, Bukhara, Uzbekistan (1318–1389 CE).
 Sayyid Alauddin Atar Bukhari, buried in Jafaaniyan, Mawranahar, Uzbekistan.
 Yaqub al-Charkhi, d. 851 AH, buried in Tajikistan
 Khwaja Ahrar, d. 895 AH, buried in Samarkand, Uzbekistan.
 Muhammad Zahid Wakhshi, d. 936 AH, buried in Wakhsh, Malk Hasaar, Tajikistan
 Darwish Muhammad, d. 970 AH, buried in Samarkand, Uzbekistan
 Muhammad Amkanagi, d. 1008 AH, buried in Akang, Bukhara, Uzbekistan
 Khwaja Baqi Billah, d. 1012 AH, buried in Delhi, India
 Ahmad al-Farūqī al-Sirhindī

See also 
Mujaddid
Ali Hujwiri
Shaykh Yaqub Sarfi Kashmiri

References

Further reading 
 Dr. Burhan Ahmad Faruqi, Mujaddid’s Conception of Tawhid, 1940
 Shari'at and Ulama in Ahmad Sirhindi's Collected Letters by Arthur F. Buehler.

External links 
 Biography of Hadrat Imâm Rabbânî
 Biography of Imam Rabbani Ahmad al-Faruqi as-Sirhindi (from the Naqshbandi-Haqqani Sufi Order).
 Translations of Imam Rabbani's Letters in various languages

1564 births
1624 deaths
17th-century Indian Muslims
Naqshbandi order
Critics of atheism
People from Fatehgarh Sahib
Sunni Sufis
Islamic philosophers
Hanafi fiqh scholars
Hanafis
Maturidis
Mujaddid
Hashemite people
Punjabi people
Indian Sufi saints
16th-century jurists
17th-century jurists
Critics of Ibn Arabi